Gordon Brown formed the Brown ministry after being invited by Queen Elizabeth II to form a new administration following the resignation of the previous Prime Minister of the United Kingdom, Tony Blair, on 27 June 2007. Brown formed his government over the course of the next day, with Jacqui Smith being appointed the United Kingdom's first female Home Secretary.

Following the 2010 general election, which resulted in a hung parliament, the government briefly remained in an acting capacity while negotiations to form a new government took place. After talks between the Labour Party and the Liberal Democrats broke down and a Conservative-Liberal Democrat coalition looked imminent, Brown resigned as Prime Minister on 11 May 2010.

Background
In comparison with Tony Blair's last Cabinet, Brown retained seventeen ministers including himself.

Alistair Darling replaced Brown as Chancellor of the Exchequer while his portfolio at Trade and Industry was renamed Business, Enterprise and Regulatory Reform and given to John Hutton. Hutton was in turn replaced as Work Secretary by Peter Hain, who continued as Wales Secretary but not as Northern Ireland Secretary, a post that went to Shaun Woodward.

David Miliband was promoted from Environment Secretary to Foreign Secretary and was replaced in that brief by Hilary Benn, then International Development Secretary. Douglas Alexander filled Benn's seat whilst his posts as Transport and Scotland Secretaries were given to Ruth Kelly and Des Browne, respectively, the latter of whom stayed on as Defence Secretary. Jack Straw became the first MP Justice Secretary and Lord Chancellor, declaring it a new Great Office of State. Amid speculation that Brown would appoint him as Deputy Prime Minister and/or First Secretary of State, neither title was conferred on any member. The other name that cropped up for the two roles was the new Labour Party Chair and Deputy Leader, Harriet Harman, who made a return to Cabinet after nine years as Leader of the House of Commons and Lord Privy Seal and was given the additional brief of Minister for Women and Equality. It was believed that the Government Equalities Office would become its own department headed by an Equalities Secretary; however, it was not given Secretary of State status. The previous home of the Equalities Office and of Ruth Kelly was the Communities Secretary, a post which was given to Hazel Blears, whose previous role as Minister without Portfolio was not given due to Harman's (the new party chair) full inclusion in Cabinet. Harman's strongest competitor for the deputy leadership, Alan Johnson, became the Health Secretary while his previous role as Education Secretary was split into a Schools Secretary and a Universities Secretary and respectively given to Ed Balls and John Denham.

Former Commons Chief Whip Jacqui Smith was given a substantial promotion as the first female Home Secretary and was replaced by Geoff Hoon, who was promoted from being the Europe Minister. His successor, Jim Murphy, was not given a provision to attend Cabinet as he was.

Tessa Jowell lost her place at the table when James Purnell became Culture Secretary but was given the right to attend Cabinet as the Olympics Minister and also became Paymaster General. The last holdover from Blair's government was Lord Grocott, who stayed on as Chief Whip in the Lords and Captain of the Gentlemen at Arms. Balls' wife, Yvette Cooper, was given the right to attend Cabinet in her role as Housing Minister as was David Miliband's brother, Ed Miliband, who became Cabinet Minister and Chancellor of the Duchy of Lancaster.

Beverley Hughes retained her role as Children Minister and was elevated to Cabinet, but was only allowed to sit in that body when her policy area was on the agenda. Additionally, Baroness Ashton of Upholland and Andy Burnham entered Cabinet as Lords Leader and Lord President of the Council and Chief Secretary to the Treasury.

Baroness Scotland of Asthal and Lord Malloch-Brown were given the right to attend Cabinet as Attorney General and Africa, Asia and UN Minister.

The last alteration to the Cabinet's composition was the removal of the Minister for Social Exclusion and the Minister of State for Trade.

Cabinets

28 June 2007 – 24 January 2008

First reshuffle: 24 January 2008 – 3 October 2008

Second reshuffle: 3 October 2008 – 5 June 2009

Third reshuffle: 5 June 2009 – 11 May 2010

List of ministers
Key:

Prime Minister

Business, Enterprise and Regulatory Reform

Business, Innovation and Skills

Cabinet Office

Children, Schools and Families

Communities and Local Government

Culture, Media and Sport

Defence

Energy and Climate Change

Environment, Food and Rural Affairs

Foreign and Commonwealth Affairs

Government Equalities Office

Health

Home Affairs

Innovation, Universities and Skills

International Development

Justice

Law Officers

Northern Ireland Office

Parliament

Ministers for the Regions

Scotland Office

Transport

Treasury

Wales Office

Work and Pensions

Whips

See also

Government of the United Kingdom
Cabinet of the United Kingdom
Blair ministry

Notes

References
Sources

External links
Full List of Government Ministers as of 29 June 2007 from the 10 Downing Street website.
Full List of Government Ministers as of 25 January 2008 from the 10 Downing Street website.
Her Majesty's Government as of 27 June 2007 from the 10 Downing Street website.
Her Majesty's Government as of 9 June 2009 from the 10 Downing Street website.
In full: Brown's government as of 27 June 2009 from BBC World News
Ministerial Appointments as of 3 October 2008 from the 10 Downing Street website.
Ministerial Appointments as of 5 June 2009 from the 10 Downing Street website.

British ministries
Government
2007 establishments in the United Kingdom
2010 disestablishments in the United Kingdom
Ministry
New Labour
2000s in the United Kingdom
Ministries of Elizabeth II
Cabinets established in 2007
Cabinets disestablished in 2010
2007 in British politics
2010s in the United Kingdom